was a Japanese centenarian who was titled the oldest living person after the death of Niwa Kawamoto on 16 November 1976, also from Japan. His case was initially verified by Guinness World Records, who titled him the oldest man ever, but Guinness later withdrew their claim; in the 2012 edition, Christian Mortensen was named the "oldest verified man ever" and Izumi was not mentioned.

Biography

Guinness World Records found a document attesting that he was 24 years old in 1889 when he was exempted from military service to deal with sugar cane fields.

Izumi drank brown sugar shōchū (a Japanese alcoholic beverage often distilled from barley or rice), and took up smoking at age 70.  Izumi's personal physician strongly advised him against drinking shōchū as his kidneys were not strong enough to process shōchū in his advanced age, but Izumi went on to say: "Without shōchū there would be no pleasure in life. I would rather die than give up drinking." He retired from sugar cane farming in 1970.

Death and uncertainty over age
After a brief hospitalization, Izumi died of pneumonia at 21:15 JST on 21 February 1986. He was one of only two people (the other being Jeanne Calment) claimed verified to have lived past their 120th birthday, although subsequent research has discounted this claim. In April 1987, 14 months after Izumi's death, the Department of Epidemiology at the Tokyo Metropolitan Institute of Gerontology reported that research into Izumi's family registration records indicated he might have been 105 when he died. The 2011 Guinness World Records book states that the birth certificate submitted as evidence might have actually belonged to a deceased brother, and the family may have re-used "Shigechiyo" as a necronym.

With the closing of the "Guinness World Record Museum" in Niagara Falls, ON in September 2020, the display and reproduction of Izumi now resides in a private collection in Canada.

The oldest undisputed case of male longevity is Jiroemon Kimura, also from Japan, who died at age 116 years and 54 days.

See also
 Longevity
 Longevity claims
 Longevity myths
 Senescence
 Supercentenarian

References

19th-century births
1986 deaths
Deaths from pneumonia in Japan
Japanese centenarians
Longevity claims
Men centenarians
People from the Amami Islands
Year of birth uncertain